Chimanimani, originally known as Melsetter, is a town in Zimbabwe.

Location
Chimanimani is a village located in Manicaland Province, in south-eastern Zimbabwe, close to the border with Mozambique. The coordinates of the village of Chimanimani are: 19° 48' 0.00"S, 32° 51' 36.00"E (Latitude:19.8000; Longitude:32.8600).

Main Sights:

Chimanimani has various nature-based attractions for visitors, most notably Bridal Veil Falls. The Bridal Veil picnic and camping site is located in a small national park about a  walk, or a short drive, from the village.  The falls itself plunges  down a sheer rock face into a crystal clear pool.  Close to the town are the Arboretum, Green Mount, and Pork Pie sanctuary,- all offering attractive walks.

The Chimanimani Mountains are a short  drive from the village. There are numerous hiking trails throughout the rugged Chimanimani range. Local guides are available. For adventure activities there is an Outward Bound centre nearby. It offers a range of activities and life-skill programs, accommodation and camping facilities, and access to the Paradise Pool. Other attractions in the Chimanimani Mountain range include the Nyakwaha and Haroni Botanical Reserves, as well as the Haroni and Mukurupiri waterfalls.

Climate 
Chimanimani receives rainfall throughout the year.

History
Chimanimani was founded by the brothers Thomas Moodie and Dunbar Moodie in 1892. In 1895 it was moved to its current site and was officially called Melsetter after Moodie's family home in Orkney in Scotland. Following Zimbabwe's independence in 1980, the name of the town was changed to Mandidzudzure, in 1982. However, after consultation with the population, the name was changed to Chimanimani.

The city was badly hit by Cyclone Idai in 2019, and was cut off from the regional capital due to damage to roads. The primary school in Chikukwa was destroyed.

Administrative divisions
Chimanimani is divided into 23 wards. Chimanimani West has 11 wards and its eastern counterpart has 12 wards. Major places in Chimanimani include Nyanyadzi, Gudyanga, Shinja, Mhakwe, Bechnough Bridge, Nhedziwa, Mutambara, Chikukwa, Chikwakwa, Sky Line, Outward bound, Copper, Ndima, Mutswangwa, Vhimba Wilderness and Hode.

Notable people from Chimanimani

Prominent people from Chimanimani include Samuel Undenge, Munacho Mutezo, Arthur Mutambara, Dr. Tafataona Mahoso, Dr. John Mangudya, and Tendai Chatara.

Population
The 1982 national census estimated the population of the town at 1,370. In 2004, the population of Chimanimani was estimated at 2,752. The next national population census in Zimbabwe is scheduled from 18 August 2012 through 28 August 2012.
Most of the inhabitants of Chimanimani are of Ndau origin.

See also
 Chimanimani District
 Manicaland Province
 Chimanimani National Park

References

External links

 Location of Chimanimani At Google Maps

Populated places established in 1892
Populated places in Manicaland Province